Sveti Andrija is an unpopulated settlement on the Croatian island of Svetac,  located in the Adriatic Sea. The island has been slowly depopulated, with its maximum population being achieved in 1961, this number being 64 inhabitants.

Geography of Split-Dalmatia County
Former populated places in Croatia